Lisa Cerasoli (born January 27, 1969, in Iron Mountain, Michigan) is an American actress. She is known for her role as Venus (V) Ardonowski  on General Hospital.

Personal life
Cerasoli moved back to Michigan from Los Angeles in 2003 to care for her father, Richard, until his death in July. Two months later, in September 2003, she wed Peter Weaver. They had a daughter, Jazzlyn "Jazz" Jo, in 2005. In 2008, Lisa's grandmother, Nora Jo, came to live with them until her death in 2010 from Alzheimer's disease. In 2013, Lisa revealed that her marriage had ended.

Career

Cerasoli portrayed the character of Venus Ardanowski on General Hospital and Port Charles from 1997 to 1999. She also made appearances on Diagnosis Murder, Pensacola: Wings of Gold, Oh, Grow Up, a couple of episodes of The Pretender as Zoe, and Boomtown.

In 2009 she published her first book, On the Brink of Bliss and Insanity, which won five national awards. In 2010 she published the memoir, As Nora Jo Fades Away: Confessions of a Caregiver. The book was optioned by RicheProductions in 2011. They optioned it to Sony in 2013 who then sold it to AMC for a TV series. In 2011, Cerasoli made her first documentary, 14 DAYS with Alzheimer's, starring her grandmother and her own daughter, Jazz. It won 16 national awards.

References

External links

1969 births
Living people
People from Iron Mountain, Michigan
American television actresses
Actresses from Michigan
21st-century American women